The Varciani were a Celtic tribe in Roman Pannonia. They were neighbors of the Latobici.

References 

Celtic tribes of Illyria